Dash is an open source cryptocurrency. It is an altcoin that was forked from the Bitcoin protocol. It is also a decentralized autonomous organization (DAO) run by a subset of its users, which are called "masternodes".

History
The currency was launched in January 2014 as "Xcoin" by Evan Duffield, as a fork of the Bitcoin protocol. It is an altcoin and in its early days it was subject to pump and dump speculation. It was rebranded as Darkcoin, which received press for being used in dark net markets. In March 2015, it rebranded again with the name Dash as a portmanteau of 'digital cash'. As of August 2016, Dash is no longer used in any major dark net markets worth noting.

In early 2017 Duffield, who lived in the Phoenix area, and some other people working on Dash took space in a business incubator at Arizona State University. The Dash DAO later funded a blockchain research lab at ASU.

, Dash's market capitalization was around $4.3 billion and it was one of the top 12 cryptocurrencies.

, Dash was the most popular cryptocurrency in Venezuela according to Der Spiegel.

In October 2022 Dash had a valued market capitalisation of 450 million USD.

Dash Halving
Dash, like Bitcoin, has a block reward. The block reward in the case of Bitcoin has halved, but in the case of Dash, the block reward only decreases by 7.14% every 210240 blocks. The block time of Dash is 2.5 minutes, which means that on average, a decrease occurs every 365 days.

The current block reward is 2.68 Dash + transaction fees. The block reward after the reduction will be 2.49 Dash + transaction fees.

Design and governance
Dash was designed to allow transactions quickly and to have a swift governance structure in order to overcome shortfalls in Bitcoin. What makes Dash different from Bitcoin is that it splits its rewards into three categories: 45% goes to miners, 45% goes to masternodes (these are computers that additional services in the network and have a significant investment in Dash tokens), and 10% goes towards its decentralized governance budget.

Governance
Governance is handled through a form of decentralized autonomous organization in which decisions are made on a blockchain via masternodes. Masternodes perform standard node functions like hosting a copy of the blockchain, relaying messages, and validating transactions on the network, and in addition act as shareholders, voting on proposals for improving Dash's ecosystem. Anyone with 1,000 Dash Coins (DASH), the protocols native cryptocurrency, can become a masternode owner. Along with masternodes, the system includes standard nodes and miners.
The system's decentralization has been criticized due to a mishap, which allowed too many coins to be distributed at release. This concentrated the wealth in a small group, giving them disproportionate power in decisions over the currency’s future.

Consensus

As of 2018, coins were mined using a proof of work algorithm with a hash function called "X11", with eleven rounds of hashing, and the average time to mine a coin was around two and a half minutes.

Masternodes provide two additional kinds of transactions. "InstantSend" bypasses mining and instead requires a consensus of masternodes to validate a transaction, speeding transactions.  "PrivateSend" is intended to give users optional consumer-grade privacy; it mixes participating users' unspent Dash before executing a transaction.

References

External links 

 

Cryptocurrency projects
2014 software
Computer-related introductions in 2014
Decentralized autonomous organizations